Magyar Posse was a Finnish post-rock band established in 2000 in the city of Pori. They have been praised by critics since their first album. Their second album achieved Top 40 status in Finland. They have toured frequently in Europe. Their first music video 'Whirlpool of Terror and Tension' (2006) won two awards in the Oulu Music Video Festival and a Kultainen Muuvi, the grand prize for Finnish music videos.

For their latest album, Random Avenger, the band got a sixth member, violinist Sandra Mahlamäki.

In 2008, the band completed an experimental film project titled Aldebaran rising with Pori-based director Petri Hagner. The film was performed on three occasions in Pori (October 17 and 18th, 2008) with live accompaniment by the band. There is no information of plans to perform the film elsewhere.

In June 2012, the band announced on their Facebook page that they had split up due to "lack of passion and motivation".

Members 
The current band members are: Olli Joukio, Tuomas Laurila, Jari Lähteinen, Mikko Rintala, Pasi Salmi, and Harri Sippola. Sandra Mahlamäki left the band in early 2010.

Albums 
 We Will Carry You Over the Mountains (Verdura Records 2002)
 Sleepwalker
 Witchcraft
 Single Sparks Are Spectral Fires
 Pacific Ocean/Death in the Desert
 (Nameless)
 Enemy Within
 The Endless Cycle of Violence
 Lufthan

 Kings of Time (Verdura Records 2004)
 I
 II
 III
 IV
 V
 VI
 VII

 Random Avenger (Verdura Records 2006)
 Whirlpool of Terror and Tension
 Sudden Death
 Black Procession
 European Lover/Random Avenger
 Intercontinental Hustle
 One By One
 Popzag

In addition the tracks "Sports" and "Combat Shock" in the album:
Tulva-kokoelma 2: Tässä me uimme, tätä me juomme (2003)
and "Robots 4 Life" from the album Huge Bass - Post It.

See also
List of post-rock bands

References

External links
 Official site (not the correct website)
 Myspace-site run by band members
 Magyar Posse's first music that won the 'kultapumpeli'-award as the best Finnish music video of the year 2006
 3 Live videos from Intimepop.com

Finnish post-rock groups
Musical groups from Pori
Musical groups established in 1999
1999 establishments in Finland